A ribbon controller is a tactile sensor used to control synthesizers. It generally consists of a resistive strip that acts as a potentiometer. Because of its continuous control, ribbon controllers are often used to produce glissando effects.

Early examples of the use of ribbon controllers in a musical instrument are in the Ondes Martenot and Trautonium. In some early instruments, the slider of the potentiometer was worn as a ring by the player. In later ribbon controllers, the ring was replaced by a conductive layer that covered the resistive element.

Ribbon controllers are found in early Moog synthesizers, but were omitted from most later synthesizers. The Yamaha CS-80 synthesizer is well-known for its inclusion of a ribbon controller, used by Vangelis to create many of the characteristic sounds in the Blade Runner soundtrack.

Although ribbon controllers are less common in later synthesizers, they were used in the Moog Liberation and Micromoog. Roland incorporated a ribbon controller in their JP-8000 synthesizer.

, ribbon controllers are available as control voltage and MIDI peripherals. An example of a modern synthesizer that uses a ribbon controller is the Swarmatron.

References

External links 
 

Sensors
Electronic musical instruments